Johan Simon Thern (born 18 September 1992) is a Swedish professional footballer who plays as a midfielder for the Allsvenskan club IFK Göteborg.

Club career

Early career
Thern started his professional career in IFK Värnamo. He was soon signed by Allsvenskan club Helsingborgs IF but was immediately loaned to Värnamo for the entire 2010 season. Thern made his Allsvenskan debut for Helsingborg in the home fixture against Syrianska FC on 22 April 2011. He made his debut in the starting eleven against Djurgårdens IF away on 4 July 2011. In total Thern played 23 matches and scored two goals in his debut season in Helsingborg who won a treble for the 2011 season. On 7 December 2011 Helsingborg announced that Thern had rejected a contract offer from the club and would leave when his contract runs out on 28 March 2012, several media has reported that Thern has signed a contract with Helsingborgs arch rivals Malmö FF.

Malmö FF
On 23 December 2011, Malmö FF confirmed that Thern had signed a three-year deal with the club. This was following an agreement with Helsingborg to terminate Thern's contract early, so he could join his new club for pre-season. He made his first competitive appearance for the club as a starter in the season opening game against Gefle on 2 April. Thern received more playing time than expected as he was used both in the central midfield but also on the left wing when needed. This was mainly due to the transfer of Jimmy Durmaz who played as left winger in the first half of the 2012 season and the fact that the competition for the starting spots in the central midfield much higher. Thern played 28 matches and scored 3 goals for Malmö FF in the league for the 2012 season.

For the league title winning 2013 season Thern played 29 matches and scored 4 goals. He also played five matches for the club in its participation for the qualifying stages of the 2013–14 UEFA Europa League. Thern became the first player to win the league with both rival Helsingborgs IF and Malmö FF. During the season he scored against his former club for the first time in a 1–1 tie at Swedbank Stadion on 29 May 2013. During Malmö FF's 2014 league winning season Thern made 14 league appearances, missing parts of the season due to a broken bone. Thern recovered during the latter part of the season to be available to play in three fixtures in the group stage of the 2014–15 UEFA Champions League.

Heerenveen
On 12 December 2014 it was announced that Thern would transfer to Dutch club Heerenveen. The transfer went through when the Dutch transfer window opened on 5 January 2015. He made his debut on 18 January 2015 in the home game against Utrecht (2-1 win).

IFK Norrköping 
Thern signed for IFK Norrköping on 15 January 2018.

IFK Göteborg 
On 22 February 2021, it was announced that Thern had signed for IFK Göteborg.

International career

Youth
Thern made his debut for Sweden U21 on 10 August 2011 in a 3–0 win against Netherlands U21.

Senior
Thern was selected for the annual training camp for the Sweden national team in January 2012 after Malmö teammates Mathias Ranégie and Ivo Pękalski had to withdraw from the squad. The squad selection for the camp traditionally feature the best Swedish players in domestic and other Scandinavian leagues. Thern was selected for the training camp once again in 2013 where he played in the first match of the 2013 King's Cup against North Korea.

Personal life 
Simon Thern is the son of Jonas Thern who had a very successful career as a professional football player in clubs such as Malmö FF, Benfica, Napoli, Roma and Rangers. Jonas Thern also played 75 matches and scored six goals for Sweden. Both Jonas and Simon started their careers in IFK Värnamo before moving on to Allsvenskan..

Controversy 
In the Scanian derby between Malmö FF and Helsingborgs IF on 24 September 2012 at Olympia in Helsingborg, a group of Helsingborg supporters unfurled a banner reading "Simon Thern skall dö" (Simon Thern shall die) along with an effigy of Thern hung from a noose. Officials allowed the game to continue. Thern had previously played for Helsingborg before moving to their rivals Malmö FF in early 2012.

Career statistics

Club
Updated 29 January 2018

International
Updated 11 January 2019
Appearances and goals by national team and year

International goals
Scores and results list Sweden's goal tally first.

Honours
;Helsingborgs IF
 Allsvenskan: 2011
 Svenska Cupen: 2011
 Svenska Supercupen: 2011

Malmö FF
 Allsvenskan: 2013, 2014
 Svenska Supercupen: 2013, 2014

References

External links

 
 

1992 births
Living people
Swedish footballers
Sweden youth international footballers
Sweden under-21 international footballers
Sweden international footballers
Swedish expatriate footballers
Expatriate footballers in the Netherlands
IFK Värnamo players
Helsingborgs IF players
Malmö FF players
AIK Fotboll players
IFK Norrköping players
IFK Göteborg players
SC Heerenveen players
Allsvenskan players
Ettan Fotboll players
Eredivisie players
People from Värnamo Municipality
Association football midfielders
Sportspeople from Jönköping County